Lao script or Akson Lao is the primary script used to write the Lao language and other minority languages in Laos. Its earlier form, the Tai Noi script, was also used to write the Isan language, but was replaced by the Thai script. It has 27 consonants, 7 consonantal ligatures, 33 vowels (/ ), and 4 tone marks.

The Lao abugida was adapted from the Khmer script, which itself was derived from the Pallava script, a variant of the Grantha script descended from the Brāhmī script, which was used in southern India and South East Asia during the 5th and 6th centuries AD. Akson Lao is a sister system to the Thai script, with which it shares many similarities and roots. However, Lao has fewer characters and is formed in a more curvilinear fashion than Thai.

Lao is written from left to right. Vowels can be written above, below, in front of, or behind consonants, with some vowel combinations written before, over, and after. Spaces for separating words and punctuation were traditionally not used, but space is used and functions in place of a comma or period. The letters have no majuscule or minuscule (upper- and lowercase) differentiation.

History

The Lao script derived locally from the Khmer script of Angkor with additional influence from the Mon script. Both Khmer and Mon were ultimately derived from the Pallava script of South India. The Lao script was slowly standardized in the Mekong River valley after the various Tai principalities of the region were merged under Lan Xang in the 14th century. It has changed little since its inception and continued use in the Lao-speaking regions of modern-day Laos and Isan. Although the Thai script continued to evolve, both scripts still bear a resemblance. However, this is less apparent today because the Lao People's Revolutionary Party has simplified the spelling to be phonemic and omitted extra letters used to write words of Pali-Sanskrit origin.

In the 1930s, Maha Sila Viravong, a Buddhist scholar, backed by the Buddhist Institute in Vientiane and the Buddhist Academic Council, added an additional set of Lao characters to support Pali and Sanskrit, thereby filling the missing gaps in the existing script. While the Buddhist Institute published books that utilised these extended Indic characters, they did not see widespread usage, and fell out of usage by 1975. In 2019, the extended Indic characters were added to Unicode 12.

Consonants
The twenty-seven consonants of the Lao alphabet are divided into three tone classes—high (ສູງ ), middle (ກາງ ), and low (ຕ່ຳ )—which determine the tonal pronunciation of the word in conjunction with the four tone marks and distinctions between short and long vowels. Aside from tone, there are twenty-one distinct consonant sounds that occur in the Lao language. Each letter has an acrophonical name that either begins with or features the letter prominently, and is used to teach the letter and serves to distinguish them from other, homophonous consonants. The letter ອ is a special null consonant used as a mandatory anchor for vowels, which cannot stand alone, and also to serve as a vowel in its own right.

The letter ຣ (r) is a relatively new re-addition to the Lao alphabet. It was dropped as part of a language reform because most speakers pronounced it as "l", and had an ambiguous status for several decades. A 1999 dictionary does not include it when listing the full alphabet but does use it to spell many country names. A comprehensive dictionary published by a high-ranking official in the Ministry of Information and Culture did not include it. However, as the Lao vocabulary began to incorporate more foreign names (such as Europe, Australia, and America) it filled a need and is now taught in schools. The letter ຣ can also be found in Unit 14 (ບົດທີ 14 ຮ ຫ ຣ) of a textbook published by the government. It is generally used as the first consonant of a syllable, or to follow a leading consonant, rarely as a final consonant.

Consonant chart
The table below shows the Lao consonant, its name, its pronunciation according to the International Phonetic Alphabet (IPA), as well as various romanization schemes, such as the French-based systems in use by both the US Board of Geographic Names and the British Permanent Committee on Geographical Names (BGN/PCGN), the English-based system in use by the US Library of Congress (LC), Royal Thai General System of Transcription (RTGS) used in Thailand, and finally its Unicode name. A slash indicates the pronunciation at the beginning juxtaposed with its pronunciation at the end of a syllable.

 Notes

Consonantal digraphs and ligatures
Lao also uses digraphs based on combinations of the silent (unpronounced) ຫ ຫ່ານ with certain other consonants, some of which also have special ligature forms that are optionally used.

In the Thai script, certain consonants are preceded by tone modifiers. This is because high consonants or low consonants cannot produce the full 5 tones of Thai. For instance, tone modifier ห can turn low consonants into high ones. This also explains why the Lao script reserved consonants with the same sounds (e.g. ຂ and ຄ /kʰ/, ສ and ຊ /s/). Both high and low consonants are needed to produce full five (or six) tones of Lao.

Such design also exists in Lao. Sonorants ງ, ຍ, ນ, ມ, ລ, ວ are originally low consonants, but when they're preceded by ຫ, they become high consonants.

The older versions of the script also included special forms for combinations of ພ (pʰ) + ຍ (ɲ), ສ (s) + ນ (n), and ມ (m) + ລ (l). In addition, consonant clusters that had the second component of ຣ (r) or ລ (l) were written with a special form ◌ຼ underneath the consonant. Since these were not pronounced in Lao, they were removed during various spelling reforms, and this symbol only appears in the ligature ຫຼ.

Phonetic
Lao characters in initial position (several letters appearing in the same box have identical pronunciation).

* In Luang Prabang dialect.
** Depends on the dialect.

Lao characters in final position. In the old documents, the letter ຽ could be found in place of ຍ.

Vowels
In its earlier form, Lao would be considered a full abugida, in which the inherent vowel is embedded in the consonant letters. With the spelling reforms by the communist Lao People's Revolutionary Party, the main vowel is now written explicitly but the rest of vowel diacritics still apply. However, many Lao outside of Laos, and some inside Laos, continue to write according to former spelling standards. For example, the old spelling of ສເຫຼີມ 'to hold a ceremony, celebrate' contrasts with the new ສະເຫລີມ/ສະເຫຼີມ.

Vowels are constructed from only a handful of basic symbols, but they can be combined with other vowel forms and semi-vowels to represent the full repertoire of diphthongs and triphthongs used in the language.
Vowels cannot stand alone or begin a syllable, so the silent consonant, ອ, which can function as a vowel in its own right, is used as a base when spelling a word that begins with a vowel sound.

The names of the vowels are just as easy as saying sala (ສະຫຼະ) before the vowel sign.
Some vowels have unique names, and these are ໃ◌ (ໄມ້ມ້ວນ, rolled stem), ໄ◌ (ໄມ້ມາຍ, unwound stem), ◌ົ (ໄມ້ກົງ, . , straight stem), ◌ັ (ໄມ້ກັນ, . , ear stem), ◌ຽ (ວິລາມ), and ◌ໍ (ນິກຄະຫິດ).

Although a dotted circle ◌ is used on this page to represent the consonant, in standard Lao orthography a small x symbol is used for this purpose.
Traditionally this was a simple, stylized, sans-serif x and it was included in Lao fonts before Unicode became widespread.
Unicode does not make it available as part of the Lao alphabet set, and a lower-case sans-serif x is often used instead.

Some vowels change their forms depending on whether they appear in the final or medial position.

Short and long vowels

Special vowels 

As in the neighboring Thai script, ◌ະ is used to represent a glottal stop after a vowel.

Punctuation
Lao is traditionally not written with spaces between words. Spaces are reserved for ends of clauses or sentences. Periods are not used, and questions can be determined by question words in a sentence. Traditional punctuation marks include ◌໌, an obsolete mark indicating silenced consonants; ໆ, used to indicate repetition of the preceding word; ຯ, the Lao ellipsis that is also used to indicate omission of words; ฯ, a more or less obsolete symbol indicating shortened form of a phrase (such as royal names); and ฯລฯ, used to indicate et cetera.

In more contemporary writing, punctuation marks are borrowed from French, such as exclamation point !, question mark ?, parentheses, and «» for quotation marks, although "" is also common. Hyphens (-) and the ellipsis (...) are also commonly found in modern writing.

Numerals

Other languages in Lao script
According to Article 89 of the 2003 Amended Constitution of the Lao People's Democratic Republic, the Lao alphabet, though originally used solely for transcribing the Lao language, is also used to write several minority languages.

Additional Lao characters used to write Pali/Sanskrit, the liturgical language of Theravāda Buddhism, are now available with the publication of Unicode 12.0. The font Lao Pali (Alpha) can be downloaded from Aksharamukha.
Additional Lao characters used to write Khmu’ were also encoded.
An older version of Lao, Tai Noi, was also used by the ethnic Lao of Thailand's Isan region before Isan was incorporated into Siam. Its use was banned by the Thai government and supplemented with the very similar Thai alphabet in 1871; however, the region remained culturally and politically distant until further government campaigns and integration into the Thai state (Thaification) were imposed in the 20th century. Attempts to encode Thai Noi in Unicode have been made.
The applicability of Lao script for other minority languages requires further evaluations.

Some minority languages use other writing systems. For example, the Hmong adopted the Romanized Popular Alphabet to spell the Hmong languages.

Lao compatible software
Linux has been available in Lao since 2005.

Windows did not officially support Lao until Windows Vista. User-generated fonts are freely available online.

In December 2011, the Lao Ministry of Science and Technology, in cooperation with the Ministry of Post and Telecommunications, officially authorized the use of Phetsarath OT as the standard national font.

The Phetsarath OT font was already adopted by the government in 2009; however, Lao users were unable to use it, as international software manufacturers did not include the font in their software systems. Mobile devices were not able to use or show Lao language. Instead, mobile phone users had to rely on Thai or English as language.

The Laos Ministry of Post and Telecommunications asked local technicians to develop a software system of international standard that would enable the Phetsarath OT font to be like other font systems that local users could access.

In March 2011, the Lao company XY Mobile presented the Phetsarath OT on mobile phones as well as tablet PCs using the mobile device operating system Android.

iOS supports Lao script on iPhones and iPads.

Obsolete consonants

The consonant letters below are obsolete, due to spelling reforms. Characters for these obsolete letters are added in later versions of Unicode. For additional details, see the Thai script page's sections for the alphabetic table and usage for Sanskrit and Pali.

Unicode 

The Unicode block for the Lao script is U+0E80–U+0EFF, added in Unicode version 1.0. The first ten characters of the row U+0EDx are the Lao numerals 0 through 9. Throughout the chart, grey (unassigned) code points are shown because the assigned Lao characters intentionally match the relative positions of the corresponding Thai characters. This has created the anomaly that the Lao letter ສ is not in alphabetical order, since it occupies the same code-point as the Thai letter ส.

See also 
 Romanization of Lao
 Lao Braille
 Literature of Laos

References

Further reading
Lew, Sigrid. "A linguistic analysis of the Lao writing system and its suitability for minority language orthographies". Writing Systems Research ahead-of-print (2013): 1–16.Authors’s accepted manuscript
 Simmala, Buasawan and Benjawan Poomsan Becker (2003), Lao for Beginners. Paiboon Publishing.

External links
Omniglot – Lao alphabet
http://www.laosoftware.com/index.php
The Lao Alphabet at SEAsite
Laos – language situation by N. J. Enfield
 Numerals in many different writing systems, which includes Lao numerals. Retrieved 2008-11-12
http://unicode-table.com/en/sections/lao/
  Lao Range: 0E80 – 0EFF, from the Unicode Consortium
Free Lao script for Windows and Mac OS X

Lao language
Brahmic scripts
Laotian culture
Writing systems without word boundaries
14th-century establishments in Asia